Kensington is a city in Douglas County, Minnesota, United States. The population was 266 at the 2020 census. The city is notable in Minnesota history for being the place where the Kensington Runestone was first displayed.  It is now at a museum in nearby Alexandria, Minnesota.

History
Kensington was platted in 1887, and named after Kensington, in London. A post office has been in operation in Kensington since 1887. Kensington was incorporated in 1891.

Geography

Minnesota State Highway 55 serves as a main route in the community.

Demographics

2010 census
As of the census of 2010, there were 292 people, 137 households, and 75 families residing in the city. The racial makeup of the city was 96.9% White, 0.3% African American, 1.0% Native American, 0.3% from other races, and 1.4% from two or more races. Hispanic or Latino of any race were 2.7% of the population.

There were 137 households, of which 23.4% had children under the age of 18 living with them, 44.5% were married couples living together, 8.8% had a female householder with no husband present, 1.5% had a male householder with no wife present, and 45.3% were non-families. 40.9% of all households were made up of individuals, and 17.5% had someone living alone who was 65 years of age or older. The average household size was 2.13 and the average family size was 2.89.

The median age in the city was 40.3 years. 20.2% of residents were under the age of 18; 8.4% were between the ages of 18 and 24; 26.7% were from 25 to 44; 27.1% were from 45 to 64; and 17.5% were 65 years of age or older. The gender makeup of the city was 50.3% male and 49.7% female.

2000 census
As of the census of 2000, there were 286 people, 132 households, and 67 families residing in the city. The racial makeup of the city was 97.55% White, 0.35% African American, 0.35% Native American, and 1.75% from two or more races. 35.4% were of German, 30.0% Norwegian, 8.7% Swedish and 5.3% Irish ancestry according to Census 2000.

There were 132 households, out of which 28.8% had children under the age of 18 living with them, 39.4% were married couples living together, 8.3% had a female householder with no husband present, and 49.2% were non-families. 40.9% of all households were made up of individuals, and 22.7% had someone living alone who was 65 years of age or older.  The average household size was 2.17 and the average family size was 3.03.

In the city, the population was spread out, with 24.8% under the age of 18, 10.8% from 18 to 24, 26.2% from 25 to 44, 18.2% from 45 to 64, and 19.9% who were 65 years of age or older.  The median age was 37 years. For every 100 females, there were 95.9 males.  For every 100 females age 18 and over, there were 93.7 males.

The median income for a household in the city was $31,979, and the median income for a family was $39,750. Males had a median income of $26,250 versus $22,500 for females. The per capita income for the city was $14,932.  About 5.1% of families and 14.8% of the population were below the poverty line, including 12.7% of those under the age of eighteen and 22.2% of those 65 or over.

References

Cities in Minnesota
Cities in Douglas County, Minnesota